is the eleventh ending theme song from the Japanese anime Kirarin Revolution. The song was released as Kirari Tsukishima's fifth single, who Kusumi portrays in the show.

Background and release

"Papancake" is the eleventh ending theme song to Kirarin Revolution and is performed by Koharu Kusumi from Morning Musume, who voices the main character, Kirari Tsukishima.

The single was released on July 16, 2008 under the Zetima label. "Oh! Tomodachi" was included as a B-side and is also performed by Kusumi under her character's name. The limited edition featured an alternate cover and came with an exclusive Kirarin Revolution: Kuru Kira Idol Days trading card, while the regular edition included a large sticker as its first press bonus.

A video single, referred as a "Single V", was released on July 30, 2008.

Music video

The music video was directed by Toshiyuki Suzuki and features Kusumi dressed up as her character, Kirari Tsukishima.

Reception

The CD single debuted at #11 in the Oricon Weekly Singles Chart and charted for 7 weeks. The video single charted at #23 on the Oricon Weekly DVD Charts and charted for 2 weeks.

Track listing

Single

DVD single

Charts

Single

DVD single

References 

2008 singles
2008 songs
Anime songs
Children's television theme songs
Hello! Project songs
Kirarin Revolution
Animated series theme songs
Zetima Records singles